Sağlam is a Turkish surname. Notable people with the surname include:

 Ahmet Sağlam (born 1987), Turkish footballer
 Aziz Sağlam (born 1982), Turkish-Belgian futsal player
 Ertuğrul Sağlam (born 1969), Turkish football coach
 Evrim Sağlam (born 1996), Turkish female archer
 Nurullah Sağlam (born 1966), Turkish football coach

See also
 Sağlam, Eğil

Turkish-language surnames